Željko Matuš (born 9 August 1935 in Donja Stubica) is a former Croatian-Yugoslavian footballer. He was part of the Yugoslav squad that won gold at the 1960 Summer Olympics.

Club career
During his club career he played for NK Dinamo Zagreb, SC Young Fellows and FC Zürich.

International career
He earned 13 caps for the Yugoslavia national football team, and took part in the 1960 European Nations' Cup and the 1962 FIFA World Cup.  He also played a friendly match for the PR Croatian national team against Indonesia in 1956, in which he scored a goal. His final international was a September 1962 friendly match against West Germany.

After the death of Viktor Ponedelnik in December 2020, Matuš became the last living participant of 1960 European Nations' Cup Final.

References

External links
 
 Profile at Reprezentacija.rs

1935 births
Living people
People from Donja Stubica
Association football forwards
Association football defenders
Croatian footballers
Croatia international footballers
Yugoslav footballers
Yugoslavia international footballers
Dual internationalists (football)
1960 European Nations' Cup players
1962 FIFA World Cup players
Olympic footballers of Yugoslavia
Footballers at the 1960 Summer Olympics
Olympic gold medalists for Yugoslavia
Medalists at the 1960 Summer Olympics
Olympic medalists in football
GNK Dinamo Zagreb players
SC Young Fellows Juventus players
FC Zürich players
Yugoslav First League players
Swiss Super League players
Swiss Challenge League players
Yugoslav expatriate footballers
Expatriate footballers in Switzerland
Yugoslav expatriate sportspeople in Switzerland